Mpondwe is a town in the Western Region of Uganda.

Location
Mpondwe is located in the Rwenzori Mountains in Kasese District. The town is at the border with the Democratic Republic of the Congo (DRC). Bwera is another settlement to the immediate east of the Mpondwe border crossing. The Mpondwe Town Council incorporates Bwera, and in this article "Mpondwe" refers to the combined "Mpondwe-Bwera" metropolitan area.

The geographical coordinates of the town are 0° 02' 24.00"N, 29° 43' 30.00"E (Latitude:0.0400; Longitude:29.7250).

Overview
Mpondwe is one of the three busiest border crossings between Uganda and the Democratic Republic of the Congo. The other two are Goli, in Nebbi District and Bunagana, in Kisoro District. The town is the busiest border crossing between the two countries, based on volume of exports and imports.

Population
In 2002, the national population census estimated the population of Mpondwe at 12,050. In 2010, the Uganda Bureau of Statistics (UBOS) estimated the population at 16,100. In 2011, UBOS estimated the mid-year population at 16,700. The national census in August 2014 put the population at 51,131.

In 2015, UBOS estimated the population of Mpondwe Municipality at 52,000. In 2020, the population agency estimated the mid-year population of the town at 58,600 people. Of these, 30,400 (51.9 percent) were females and 28,200 (48.1 percent) were males. UBOS calculated the annual population growth rate of Mpondwe to average 2.34 percent per year, between 2015 and 2020.

One Stop Border Post
In March 2018, The Independent (Uganda) reported that the government of Uganda, had secured a loan of US$14 million (USh50.4 billion), to facilitate cross-border trade between Uganda and DR Congo. The Ugandan government, through the Uganda Ministry of Trade, Industry and Cooperatives and the Uganda Ministry of Works and Transport, in collaboration with other stakeholders plans to use the borrowed funds to construct a one-stop-border-post (OSBP) and a Border Export Zone (BEZ) at Mpondwe. Construction of the OSBP and BEZ was officially commissioned on Thursday 17 April 2019, by president Yoweri Museveni of Uganda. As of June 2022, completion of the OSBP and BEZ was estimated at 92 percent.

Points of interest
The following points of interest lie within the town limits or close to the edges of town:

1. Offices of the Uganda Revenue Authority

2. Bwera General Hospital - A 120-bed public Hospital, administered by the Uganda Ministry of Health

3. Mpondwe Central Market

4. Offices of Mpondwe-Bwera Town Council

5. International border crossing between Uganda and the Democratic Republic of the Congo

6. Mpondwe Border Export Zone (In development).

7. The Mbarara–Kisangani Road crosses between Uganda and DRC at this location.

Prominent people
 Crispus Kiyonga - Physician and politician. Current Ambassador to China and former Minister of defence in the Cabinet of Uganda. He was born here and maintains a home in the area. He also served as the elected member of Parliament for this constituency.

See also
Rwenzururu
Queen Elizabeth National Park
List of cities and towns in Uganda

References

Kasese District
Rwenzururu sub-region
Populated places in Western Region, Uganda
Democratic Republic of the Congo–Uganda border crossings
Cities in the Great Rift Valley